Przyjezierze may refer to the following places:
Przyjezierze, Kuyavian-Pomeranian Voivodeship (north-central Poland)
Przyjezierze, Pomeranian Voivodeship (north Poland)
Przyjezierze, Gryfino County in West Pomeranian Voivodeship (north-west Poland)
Przyjezierze, Szczecinek County in West Pomeranian Voivodeship (north-west Poland)